Shahsat Hujahmat (born 7 July 2006) is a Chinese footballer currently playing as a forward for Shenzhen.

Club career
Born in Yining, Xinjiang, Hujahmat started his career in the Shenzhen academy. He was promoted to the first team at the end of August 2022, and became the first player born in 2006 to play in the Chinese Super League when he made his debut the following month, on 21 September. He recorded his first assist for Shenzhen on 15 December 2022, helping his side to a 4–2 win over Guangzhou.

International career
Hujahmat has represented China from under-15 to under-19 level.

Career statistics

Club
.

References

2006 births
Living people
Footballers from Xinjiang
Chinese footballers
China youth international footballers
Association football forwards
Chinese Super League players
Shenzhen F.C. players